The Paria Peninsula is a large peninsula on the Caribbean Sea, in the state of Sucre in northern Venezuela.

Geography
Separating the Caribbean Sea from the Gulf of Paria, the peninsula is part of the  mountain range, in the Venezuelan Coastal Range portion of the northern Andes. Its tip is within sight of the naked eye from the island of Trinidad.

National Park
Península de Paria National Park protects a section of the peninsula.

Paria Region
As a political subdivision, the Paria Region of the Paria Peninsula is the aggregation of six municipalities within Sucre State: 
Bermúdez Municipality – (capital: Carúpano),
Arismendi Municipality – (capital: Río Caribe),
Benítez Municipality – (capital: El Pilar),
Libertador Municipality – (capital: Tunapuy),
Mariño Municipality – (capital: Irapa)
Valdez Municipality – (capital: Güiria).

See also

References
 

Peninsulas of Venezuela
Geography of Sucre (state)
Gulf of Paria
Venezuelan Coastal Range